Baillie-Hamilton Island is one of the uninhabited members of the Queen Elizabeth Islands in the Canadian arctic islands in Nunavut, Canada.

Baillie-Hamilton Island is surrounded by larger islands. Devon Island is to the north and the east, across Wellington Channel. Cornwallis Island is to the south, across Maury Channel. Bathurst Island is to the west, across Queens Channel.

References

External links
 Baillie-Hamilton Island in the Atlas of Canada - Toporama; Natural Resources Canada

Islands of the Queen Elizabeth Islands
Uninhabited islands of Qikiqtaaluk Region